Double Fudge is a 2002 children's novel by Judy Blume and the fifth and final entry in the Fudge series. The Hatcher family goes to Washington, D.C. where they spend time with their extended family, and Fudge finds out that his cousin is also named Farley Drexel Hatcher. His interest in money is a common theme throughout the story.

Plot
In this latest installment of the Fudge series, Fudge is still five years old and takes up an obsessive and greedy love for money, driving his twelve-year-old brother, Peter, insane, and after some talking with his family, they decide to take him to the Bureau of Engraving and Printing in Washington, D.C. for a long weekend to show how it is made, hoping that his obsession would stop there. That plan doesn't work, and instead, they meet up with their long-lost cousins, the Howie Hatchers. There is Howie, a park ranger who resides in Hawaii and is traveling the country, his pregnant wife, Eudora, their perfect, slightly overindulged twelve-year-old identical twin daughters, Flora and Fauna, who are sometimes nicknamed the "Natural Beauties" and the "Heavenly Hatchers", and last but not least, three-year-old Farley Drexel Hatcher, which is also Fudge's real name. Peter dubs him "Mini", and the nickname sticks. The Hatchers are forced when the Howie Hatchers invite themselves to move in with them for weeks in their Upper West Side apartment.

Peter is also having a rough time throughout the story because his best friend, Jimmy Fargo, has left the Upper West Side and moved "far off" to SoHo on the other side of Manhattan, although they still get to go to the same school, where they're both in the seventh grade, while Fudge is in *Mixed* group, along with his new friend, Melissa Beth Miller.
      
Near the end of the story, in a semi-homage to the ending of the first novel, Mini swallows Fudge's baby tooth that just fell out, making him furious at him because he was planning to get a dollar for it from the tooth fairy. After the Howie Hatchers leave with Mini for good, Fudge throws a temper tantrum over what Mini did, saying he hated him. Then Peter tells him that he felt the same way when Fudge swallowed his pet turtle, Dribble, in Tales of a Fourth Grade Nothing. Genuinely surprised at this news, Fudge thinks about this and finally realizes that he hasn't been a very good brother to him.

References

External links

 Judy Blume's website
 Official website

2002 American novels

American children's novels
Fudge series
Novels by Judy Blume
Novels set in New York City
Novels set in Washington, D.C.
Sequel novels
2002 children's books